Maledivibacter is a bacterial genus from the family of Clostridiaceae with one known species (Maledivibacter halophilus). Clostridium halophilum has been reclassified to Maledivibacter halophilus.

References

Peptostreptococcaceae
Bacteria genera
Monotypic bacteria genera
Taxa described in 2016
Bacteria described in 1991